Nguyễn Thị Ngọc Hoa (born November 10, 1987 in Long An) is a Vietnamese indoor volleyball player. She is a former captain of the Vietnam women's national volleyball team.

Career
Hoa played on loan with Ayutthaya A.T.C.C for the 2013/14 season and Bangkok Glass VC from the 2014/15 season to 2016/17 season. With Bangkok Glass VC, she played the 2016 FIVB Women's Club World Championship and finishing in the seventh place.

Clubs
  VTV Bình Điền Long An (2000 – 2018, 2022)
  Ayutthaya A.T.C.C (2013 – 2014)
  Bangkok Glass VC (2014 – 2017)

Awards

Individual 
 2004 VTV International Cup "Best Middle Blocker"
 2005 VTV International Cup "Best Middle Blocker"
 2007 VTV International Cup "Best Blocker"
 2007 VTV International Cup "Best Spiker"
 2007 Asian Club Championship "Best Blocker"
 2007 Asian Club Championship "Best Scorer"
 2009 VTV International Cup "Most Valuable Player"
 2012 VTV International Cup "Best Blocker"
 2012 VTV International Cup "Best Spiker"
 2013 VTV International Cup "Most Valuable Player"
 2013–14 Thailand League "Best Middle Blocker"
 2014 VTV International Cup "Most Valuable Player"
 2015 VTV International Cup "Best Middle Blocker"
 2015 Asian Club Championship "Best Middle Blocker"
 2017 Vietnam League "Best Middle Blocker"
 2017 Vietnam League "Most Valuable Player"
 2017 VTV International Cup "Best Middle Blocker"
 2018 Vietnam League "Best Middle Blocker"

Clubs 
 2007 Vietnam League -  Runner-Up, with VTV Bình Điền Long An
 2008 Vietnam League -  Bronze medal, with VTV Bình Điền Long An
 2009 Vietnam League -  Champion, with VTV Bình Điền Long An
 2010 Vietnam League -  Bronze medal, with VTV Bình Điền Long An
 2011 Vietnam League -  Champion, with VTV Bình Điền Long An
 2012 Vietnam League -  Bronze medal, with VTV Bình Điền Long An
 2013 Thai-Denmark Super League -  Bronze medal, with Ayutthaya A.T.C.C
 2013–14 Thailand League -  Bronze medal, with Ayutthaya A.T.C.C
 2014 Thai-Denmark Super League -  Champion, with Ayutthaya A.T.C.C
 2014 Vietnam League -  Runner-Up, with VTV Bình Điền Long An
 2014–15 Thailand League -  Champion, with Bangkok Glass
 2015 Asian Club Championship -  Champion, with Bangkok Glass
 2015 Vietnam League -  Bronze medal, with VTV Bình Điền Long An
 2015–16 Thailand League -  Champion, with Bangkok Glass
 2016 Asian Club Championship -  Bronze medal, with Bangkok Glass
 2016 Vietnam League -  Bronze medal, with VTV Bình Điền Long An
 2016–17 Thailand League -  Runner-Up, with Bangkok Glass
 2017 Vietnam League -  Champion, with VTV Bình Điền Long An
 2018 Vietnam League -  Champion, with VTV Bình Điền Long An
 2022 Vietnam League -  Bronze medal, with VTV Bình Điền Long An

References

1987 births
Living people
Vietnamese women's volleyball players
Volleyball players at the 2006 Asian Games
Vietnamese expatriate sportspeople in Thailand
People from Long An Province
Vietnam women's international volleyball players
Southeast Asian Games silver medalists for Vietnam
Southeast Asian Games medalists in volleyball
Competitors at the 2009 Southeast Asian Games
Asian Games competitors for Vietnam
Middle blockers
21st-century Vietnamese women